Walter Lyghe was a medieval Bishop of Worcester elect. He was elected on 7 December 1373 but his election was quashed on about 12 September 1375.

Citations

References

 

Bishops of Worcester